The Journal of Sensory Studies is a peer-reviewed scientific journal that covers research on "human reactions to basic tastes on foods, beverages, wine, liquor/beer, the environment, medications, and other human exposures in every day life". It is published by Wiley-Blackwell in collaboration with the Society of Sensory Professionals.

References

External links 
 
 Society of Sensory Professionals

Bimonthly journals
Wiley-Blackwell academic journals
English-language journals
Food science journals
Publications established in 1986